Tees Toh is a census-designated place in Navajo County, in the U.S. state of Arizona. The population was 448 at the 2010 census.

Demographics

As of the census of 2010, there were 448 people, 118 households, and 90 families living in the CDP.

Education
The community is not in any school district.

References

Census-designated places in Navajo County, Arizona
Census-designated places in Arizona